Glasul, known later as Glasul Naţiunii, was the first newspaper in the Republic of Moldova to appear in the Latin alphabet during the dying years of the Soviet Union. Glasul Naţiunii was founded in 1988 by Leonida Lari.

History
The first issue of Glasul Naţiunii was printed in Riga in 1988, the second one in Vilnius the same year, and the third one was printed in Chişinău on February 15, 1989. After discovering that copies of the first issue were circulating in Chişinău, Semion Grossu declared the publication illegal.

See also
 Deşteptarea (newspaper)

References

External links 
 Consiliul de Administrare al A.P.I. se arata ingrijorat de situatia revistei „Glasul Natiunii” 
 Leonida Lari „între îngeri şi demoni” 
 The newly independent states of Eurasia: handbook of former Soviet republics By Stephen K. Batalden, Sandra L. Batalden

Literary magazines published in Moldova
Magazines established in 1988
Romanian-language magazines
Mass media in Chișinău